Lowjee is a railway station on the Central line of the Mumbai Suburban Railway network. It is on the Karjat–Khopoli route. Dolavli is the previous station and Khopoli is the next station.

Mumbai Suburban Railway stations
Railway stations in Raigad district
Karjat-Khopoli rail line